Hold'em is a 2014 American thriller film directed by Clay Dumaw.  The film's plot combines Texas hold 'em with elements from horror and thriller films such as Battle Royale and Saw.

Synopsis
Former poker pro, Jake Emerson joins an underground card game with a million dollars at stake, but the entry fee is more than he bargained for.  He along with long-time rivals Marcus Lester and Cyrus Wolf assemble in a dreary warehouse for a battle royale of cards.  Each player who loses is killed, and the last man standing walks away an undisputed champion.

Cast
Richard Cooke as Jake Emerson
Jay Storey as Nathaniel Savage
Peter Doroha as Cyrus Wolf
David Iannotti as Marcus Lester
Fyne Print Williams as Valentine
John Henderson as Bruno Grimes
Eric Scordo as Otto Freeman
Dalton Beach as Elmo Richards
Hassan McKnight as Henchmen

Production
The film was shot almost entirely handheld, and the cast supplied their own wardrobe.  Because much of the production took place at night, the windows in the film's primary location had to be digitally corrected to appear as though it were day.  Peter Doroha's identical twin brother, Stephen Doroha, did all his stunts and was his stand-in on days when he couldn't be on set.

Reception
The film received an Official Selection at the 2014 Scare-a-Con Film Festival.  It also screened at the 2014 Buffalo International Film Festival and the 2015 Snowtown Film Festival

References

External links
 

2014 films
2014 thriller films
American thriller films
2010s English-language films
2010s American films